San Julián, is a mountain in the Cordillera Blanca in the Andes of Peru; within the district of Yuracmarca, Huaylas Province, Ancash.

References 

Mountains of Peru
Mountains of Ancash Region